Airborne Ranger is an action game developed and published by MicroProse for the Commodore 64 and  ZX Spectrum in 1987 and the Amstrad CPC and IBM PC compatibles in 1988. Ports to the Amiga and Atari ST by Imagitec Design were released in 1989. A sole U.S. Army Ranger is sent to infiltrate the enemy territory to complete various objectives. The game was followed by Special Forces in 1991.

Gameplay

The game consists of several missions, in which the player controls a sole Ranger whose objectives include capturing an enemy officer, destroying an enemy bunker, taking out a SAM site, and rescuing a captured POW, which would possibly free a roster member that was labeled P.O.W. The game creates the maps and objective locations randomly, so the player is required to plan each mission carefully, because no mission is the same.

At the start of each mission, the player is presented with a short overview of the mission, and can select a Ranger from a roster of available soldiers. The player is then in control of an aircraft, described as a V-22 Osprey and is allowed to drop three ammo crates over the enemy territory. Once the three containers are dropped, the Ranger is parachuted into the area. Upon touch-down, the player has to overcome several obstacles, including enemy soldiers and officers, mine fields, foxholes and bunkers. Due to limited ammunition, the player needs to plan his path through the territory. The dropped ammo crates provide the soldier with fresh hand grenades and ammo. After completing the mission, the Ranger has to navigate to a pick-up point within a time limit. If the Ranger is captured (but not killed), the player can start an optional rescue mission using another soldier from the roster. Each successful mission increases the rank of the individual Ranger, up to colonel.

Reception
A review in Computer Gaming World felt Airborne Ranger was reminiscent of the earlier arcade game Commando, but much deeper and more versatile. The graphics and sound were praised, noting gunfire sounds different when shot from inside fortifications than it does outside fortifications. The magazine's 1992 survey of computer wargames with modern settings gave the game four and a half stars out of five. In a 1994 survey of wargames the magazine gave the title two-plus stars out of five, describing it as "Contemporary Ranger operations in a semi-arcade mode that works. Challenging and fun for both adults and children". It also received 4½ out of 5 stars in Dragon.

Compute!'s Gazette noted that Airborne Ranger was an unusual game for MicroProse's developers given their history of publishing simulations, writing "they have created an arcade game, and a darned good one". Compute! stated that "Airborne Ranger is an excellent game from beginning to end", but cautioned that "the violence and action are graphic and highly realistic".

References

External links

Airborne Ranger at C64Sets.com
Airborne Ranger at Amiga Hall of Light
Airborne Ranger at Atari Mania
Airborne Ranger at Spectrum Computing

1987 video games
Amiga games
Amstrad CPC games
Atari ST games
Cancelled Nintendo Entertainment System games
Cancelled Super Nintendo Entertainment System games
Cold War video games
Commodore 64 games
DOS games
MicroProse games
Single-player video games
Video games developed in the United States
Video games scored by Barry Leitch
Video games with isometric graphics
ZX Spectrum games